Bland tomtar och troll (Among Gnomes and Trolls) was the 1986 edition of Sveriges Radio's Christmas Calendar.

Plot
Olof Buckard reads fairy tales from the Swedish fairy tale anthology Among Gnomes and Trolls.

Cassette tapes
In 1987, it was also released to cassette tape, as an audiobook.

References
 

Swedish radio programs
Swedish children's radio programs
1986 radio programme debuts
1986 radio programme endings
Trolls in popular culture
Sveriges Radio's Christmas Calendar